"In Yer Face" is a song by English electronic music group 808 State, released in 1991 from the album Ex:el. The song peaked at number 9 on the UK Singles Chart in 1991.

Track listings

7" vinyl
A.  "In Yer Face" (Edit)
B.  "Leo Leo"

12" vinyl
A.  "In Yer Face" (In Yer Face Mix)
B.  "Leo Leo" (featuring Raagman)

Remix version
"In Yer Face" (Facially Yours Remix)
"Leo Leo" (Poonchanting Instrumental)

12" promo
A1.  "In Yer Face" (In Yer Face Mix)
A2.  "In Yer Face" (Facially Yours Remix)
B1.  "Leo Leo" (featuring Raagman)
B2.  "Leo Leo" (Poonchanting Instrumental)

CD single
 "In Yer Face" (Edit)
 "In Yer Face" (In Yer Face Mix)
 "Leo Leo" (featuring Raagman)

Cassette single
 "In Yer Face" (Edit)
 "Leo Leo" (Edit)

References

External links
In Yer Face at Discogs

1991 singles
1991 songs
ZTT Records singles
808 State songs